The Colonial is a historic apartment building located at Indianapolis, Indiana, United States.  It was built in 1900, and is a three-story, eight bay by ten bay, Classical Revival style yellow brick building.  It features a variety of terracotta decorative elements and two-story bay windows on the upper floors.

It was listed on the National Register of Historic Places in 1983.

References

Residential buildings on the National Register of Historic Places in Indiana
Residential buildings completed in 1900
Neoclassical architecture in Indiana
Residential buildings in Indianapolis
National Register of Historic Places in Indianapolis